The Italian is the debut album by Italian baritone Patrizio Buanne. It was released in the United Kingdom on February 28, 2005, and the United States on March 7, 2006.

The album is composed of romantic Italian tunes, influenced by the songs of Italian and Italian-American singers (such as Sergio Bruni and Frank Sinatra) that Buanne heard played as a youth in his father's Italian restaurant. Buanne strives to re-invent the classics of that era with this new album of traditional songs arranged in a fresh style and sung in both Italian and English.

Track listing

Special Editions
There are several different editions available of the album worldwide. Some include That's Amore and Winter Wonderland as bonus tracks.

Charts

Certifications

References

2005 debut albums
Patrizio Buanne albums